Ταμάμ ( "Okay") is a Greek television comedy-drama series. It premiered in October 2014 on ANT1. The series is based on the German TV series Türkisch für Anfänger.

The show focuses on the Greek-Turkish family Christidou-Öztürk, their everyday lives, and particularly on the eldest daughter Elli, who narrates the show. Show topics included typical problems of teenagers and cross-cultural experiences among the Greek and Turkish people. Viewers watch Cem and Elli's rocky relationship turning into a love story. Tamam was said to be the most popular TV series of ANT1 when its third season aired in October 2016.

Series οverview

Plot

Season 1

The new "family" has to get used to each other: Elli and Dilek have to share a room, complicating their sisterhood, as does the fact that Elli is an atheist and Dilek a pious Muslim girl wearing a hijab. Myrto, who is very free-spirited, has to get used to her new role as a mother of four instead of two. Her stepchildren include stepson Cem, a bit of "macho", and her stepdaughter, who is critical of her rudimentary kitchen skills. Meanwhile, Elli and Niko have to try to fit in at their new school, which is different from their old school. In the meantime, their relationship with their stepbrothers gets worse and worse. Elli and Cem won't stop fighting and both Dilek and Elli don't like each other. Elli's best friend Katerina is away at Dubai and Elli communicates with her via videos. Strangely enough, Dilek and Niko develop a good and loving relationship, which is unlike what is happening between Elli and Cem. Things get even worse when Alexis meets Elli at school, becoming friends with her, and Cem has to deal with the fact that he is jealous of their relationship. Later, Alexis and Elli fall in love, and Cem tries to find effective ways to take Elli away from him. Myrto and Metin both face problems but get over them quickly because of their love for each other. At the end of the season, Elli falls in love with Cem and the family is ready to go under challenges and strange situations.

Season 2

Cast

Main cast

Guest stars

Season 1

Season 2

Production
Initially, the show was partially filmed at a neoclassical apartment in Kypseli, Athens.

International broadcasts 
 Greece - ANT1
 United States - ANT1 SATELLITE
 Canada - ANT1 SATELLITE

References

ANT1 original programming
Greek drama television series
2010s Greek television series
2014 Greek television series debuts
2017 Greek television series endings